The 1994–95 Drake Bulldogs men's basketball team represented Drake University during the 1994–95 NCAA Division I men's basketball season. The Bulldogs, led by 5th-year head coach Rudy Washington, played their home games at the Knapp Center in Des Moines, Iowa, as members of the Missouri Valley Conference (MVC).

The Bulldogs struggled to find rhythm throughout the season. After losing 4 of 5 to open their schedule, the team essentially alternated wins and losses for the remainder of the season. Incredibly, the entire conference slate produced just one two-game streak (win). Drake finished the season with a record of 12–15 (9–9 MVC).

Roster

Schedule and results

|-
!colspan=9 style=| Non-conference regular season

|-
!colspan=9 style=| MVC regular season

|-
!colspan=12 style=| MVC Tournament

Source

References

Drake Bulldogs men's basketball seasons
Drake
Drake
Drake